Ernest Keogh (1869 – 1951) was an Australian cricketer. He played one first-class match for Western Australia in 1898/99.

See also
 List of Western Australia first-class cricketers

References

External links
 

1869 births
1951 deaths
Australian cricketers
Western Australia cricketers
Cricketers from Melbourne